The Inter–Mountain League was a minor league baseball league that played in the 1901 and 1909 baseball seasons. League franchises were based in Idaho, Montana and Utah.

History
The 1901 Inter–Mountain League was an Independent league that fielded four clubs, all based in Utah: the Ogden Lobsters, Salt Lake City White Wings, Railway Ducks/Lagoon Farmers and Park City Miners. The league folded after the 1901 season, with the forming of the 1902 Utah State League.

The league reformed in 1909. The 1909 Inter–Mountain League was a Class D level minor league, comprising the Helena Senators, Salt Lake City Mormons (moved to Livingston), Butte Miners and Boise Irrigators (moved to become Bozeman Irrigators. The Inter–Mountain league permanently disbanded on July 25, 1909.

Cities represented 
Boise, ID: Boise Irrigators 1909
Bozeman, MT: Bozeman Irrigators 1909
Butte, MT: Butte Miners 1909
Farmington, UT: Lagoon Farmers 1901
Helena, MT: Helena Senators 1909
Livingston, MT: Livingston 1909 
Ogden, UT: Ogden Lobsters 1901
Park City, UT: Park City Miners 1901 
Salt Lake City, UT: Salt Lake City White Wings 1901; Salt Lake City, UT: Salt Lake City Mormons 1909

Standings & statistics

1901 Inter–Mountain League
schedule
 Railway (5–7) sold franchise to the owner of Lagoon Resort, June 8 Park City disbanded July 15 with remaining games forfeited.

1909 Inter–Mountain League
schedule
 Salt Lake City (34–17) moved to Livingston July 10; Boise (13–38) moved to Bozeman July 10; Butte disbanded July 18.League disbanded July 25.

See also
 Intermountain West

References

Defunct independent baseball leagues in the United States
1901 in sports in Utah
1901 in baseball
Sports leagues established in 1901
Sports leagues disestablished in 1901
1901 establishments in Utah
1901 disestablishments in Utah
Baseball in Utah
Defunct baseball teams in Utah
Baseball leagues in Utah
Baseball leagues in Montana
Defunct minor baseball leagues in the United States